Daniel Alejandro Lembo Betancor (born 15 February 1978) is a Uruguayan former professional footballer who played mainly as a central defender.

Club career
Born in the capital Montevideo, Lembo started his career with C.A. Bella Vista, playing three years with the team. In July 2000 he signed for Serie A's Parma AC, but left without playing a single game, returning to his country and joining Club Nacional de Football, for which he scored nine goals in the Primera División en route to winning three consecutive national championships.

Lembo moved to Spain's Real Betis for the 2003–04 season, and went on to play in 59 official matches netting once, in a 1–0 La Liga home win over Celta de Vigo on 31 January 2004. Although playing a major role in the Andalusia club's Copa del Rey run in the 2004–05 campaign, he was dropped for the final, and would only appear in four league matches in the next two years combined, mainly due to injuries.

Lembo returned to his homeland and hometown in 2007–08, signing with Danubio F.C. but, the following season, on 26 June 2008, he penned a two-year contract with Aris F.C. from Greece.

International career
Lembo gained 39 caps for Uruguay, making his debut on 17 June 1999 in a 3–2 friendly win with Paraguay in Ciudad del Este, and took part in that year's Copa América as the nation finished second to Brazil, scoring one of his two international goals in the 1–1 semifinal match against Chile (penalty shootout win).

Lembo was part of Uruguay's squad at the 2002 FIFA World Cup, playing the full 90 minutes in the draws against France and Senegal.

Honours
Nacional
Uruguayan Primera División: 2001, 2002, 2010–11

Betis
Copa del Rey: 2004–05

Uruguay
Copa América: runner-up 1999

References

External links

National team data 

1978 births
Living people
Footballers from Montevideo
Uruguayan footballers
Association football defenders
Uruguayan Primera División players
C.A. Bella Vista players
Club Nacional de Football players
Danubio F.C. players
Parma Calcio 1913 players
La Liga players
Real Betis players
Super League Greece players
Aris Thessaloniki F.C. players
Argentine Primera División players
Club Atlético Belgrano footballers
Uruguay under-20 international footballers
Uruguay international footballers
2002 FIFA World Cup players
1999 Copa América players
Uruguayan expatriate footballers
Uruguayan expatriate sportspeople in Italy
Expatriate footballers in Italy
Uruguayan expatriate sportspeople in Spain
Expatriate footballers in Spain
Uruguayan expatriate sportspeople in Greece
Expatriate footballers in Greece
Uruguayan expatriate sportspeople in Argentina
Expatriate footballers in Argentina